Les Brasseurs RJ is a brewery located in Montreal, Quebec, Canada. The company was founded in 1998 by Roger Jaar from the merger of three microbreweries: Les Brasseurs GMT, La Brasserie Le Cheval Blanc and Les Brasseurs de l'Anse. Current annual production capacity is over 125,000 hL; they claim to be the largest microbrewery in Quebec. They currently employ 450 people, including employees at the head office in Montreal, a distribution centre in Quebec City, and a brewery in l'Anse St-Jean that fills beer kegs.

In addition to a variety of beers of their own fabrication and recipe, the microbrewery brews two d'Achouffe beers under licence and distributes the Bitburger Premium Beer, Köstritzer Schwarzbier, König Pilsner, and Wernesgrüner for the Quebec market. A portion of their sales from the "Rescousse" brand used to collect funds for the preservation of endangered species via a donation to the Fondation de la faune du Québec.

Due to the brewery's location in the Plateau-Mont-Royal borough in Montreal, and their extensive sponsorship of local events, they are known as the "Official Brewer of the Avenue" (Mount-Royal Avenue)

Peter McAuslan, President, and Ellen Bounsall, Vice-President Production, founders and majority shareholders of La Brasserie McAuslan Brewing Inc., announced in April 2014 that they sold their holdings to Les Brasseurs RJ. They will have no further role in the operations of McAuslan.

See also
Quebec beer
Canadian beer

References

External links
Les Brasseurs RJ

Beer brewing companies based in Quebec
Food and drink companies based in Montreal
Manufacturing companies based in Montreal
Le Plateau-Mont-Royal
Food and drink companies established in 1998
1998 establishments in Quebec